Fritillaria chitralensis  is a species of flowering plant in the lily family Liliaceae, native to Afghanistan and the Chitral District of northern Pakistan.

It is closely related to the more widely cultivated species, F. imperialis, called "crown imperial."

Fritillaria chitralensis produces bulbs up to 30 mm across. Stems can reach a height of  45 cm. Flowers are bell-shaped, hanging downwards, bright yellow.

References

chitralensis
Plants described in 1996
Flora of Asia
Garden plants